To Be or Not to Be may refer to:

 To be, or not to be, the speech from Hamlet.

Films and TV, theatre and books
 To Be or Not to Be (1942 film), directed by Ernst Lubitsch
 To Be or Not to Be (1983 film), a remake produced by Mel Brooks
 To Be or Not to Be (TV series), starring Maggie Cheung Ho-yee and Prudence Liew
 To Be or Not to Be (play), by Nick Whitby
 To Be or Not to Be: That Is the Adventure, an adventure book by Ryan North
 "To Be or Not to Be", television series episode, see List of seaQuest DSV episodes

Music

Albums
 To Be or Not to Be (album), a 2013 album by Nightmare
To Be or Not to Be, album by Cliffhanger (band)
To Be or Not to Be, album by Crash (South Korean band)

Songs
"To Be or Not to Be", 1980 song by BA Robertson
"To Be or Not to Be (The Hitler Rap)", 1983 song by Mel Brooks
"To Be or Not to Be", Otis Leavill, composed by Billy Butler 1965
"To Be or Not to Be", 1965 song by the Bee Gees, from The Bee Gees Sing and Play 14 Barry Gibb Songs
"To Be or Not to Be", The Buckinghams	1965
"To Be or Not to Be", French song by Eddy Mitchell composed by Claude Moine and Jean-Pierre Bourtayre	1965
"To Be or Not to Be", The Mindbenders	1967
"To Be or Not to Be", Johnny Farnham, composed Farnham 1975
"To Be or Not to Be", by Irving Berlin

See also
"2 B R 0 2 B", 1962 short story by Kurt Vonnegut
To Be or Not to Bop, 1979 book

Television series episodes
"Toby or Not Toby", 2016 episode of Scorpion
"TB or Not TB"